Xu Xiaolong (born December 20, 1992) is a Chinese triple jumper. He won a bronze medal at the 2015 Summer Universiade in Gwangju, South Korea, and eventually represented his nation China at the 2016 Summer Olympics, finishing eleventh in the final round of the men's triple jump.

Xu competed for the Chinese squad, alongside his teammates Cao Shuo and Dong Bin, in the men's triple jump at the 2016 Summer Olympics in Rio de Janeiro. Leading up his maiden Games, he popped an outdoor personal best of 16.93 m to surpass the IAAF Olympic entry standard (16.85) by an eight-centimetre margin at the National Grand Prix in Taiyuan. Xu managed to leap a distance of 16.41 m on his initial attempt to round out the field of twelve finalists in penultimate position, just 24 centimetres shy of his season best (16.65) that he set earlier during the qualifying phase.

Competition record

References

External links
 

Chinese male triple jumpers
Living people
Place of birth missing (living people)
1992 births
World Athletics Championships athletes for China
Athletes (track and field) at the 2016 Summer Olympics
Olympic athletes of China
Universiade medalists in athletics (track and field)
Olympic male triple jumpers
Universiade bronze medalists for China
Medalists at the 2015 Summer Universiade